The 2010–11 Argentine Primera B Nacional was the 25th season of second division professional of football in Argentina. A total of 20 teams competed; the champion and runner-up were promoted to Argentine Primera División.

Club information

Standings

Promotion/relegation playoff Legs Primera División-Primera B Nacional
The 3rd and 4th placed of the table played with the 18th and the 17th placed of the Relegation Table of 2010–11 Primera División.

|-
!colspan="5"|Promotion playoff 1

|-
!colspan="5"|Promotion playoff 2

|-
|}

Belgrano was promoted to 2011–12 Primera División  by winning the playoff and River Plate was relegated to 2011–12 Primera B Nacional.
San Martín (SJ) was promoted to 2011–12 Primera División  by winning the playoff and Gimnasia y Esgrima (LP) was relegated to 2011–12 Primera B Nacional.

Results

Relegation

Note: Clubs with indirect affiliation with AFA are relegated to the Torneo Argentino A, while clubs directly affiliated face relegation to Primera B Metropolitana. Clubs with direct affiliation are all from Greater Buenos Aires, with the exception of Newell's, Rosario Central, Central Córdoba and Argentino de Rosario, all from Rosario, and Unión and Colón from Santa Fe.

The bottom two teams of this table face relegation regardless of their affiliation status. Apart from them, the bottom teams of each affiliation face promotion/relegation playoffs against Torneo Argentino A and Primera B Metropolitana's "Reducido" (reduced tournaments) champions. The Reducidos are played after those leagues' champions are known.

Updated as of games played on December 9, 2010.Source:

Relegation Playoff Legs

|-
!colspan="5"|Relegation/promotion playoff 1 (Indirect affiliation vs. Primera B Metropolitana)

|-
!colspan="5"|Relegation/promotion playoff 2 (Indirect affiliation vs. Torneo Argentino A)

 Independiente Rivadavia remained in the Primera B Nacional after a 2-2 aggregate tie by virtue of a "sports advantage". In case of a tie in goals, the team from the Primera B Nacional gets to stay in it.
 Desamparados qualified to the 2011–12 Primera B Nacional and San Martín (T) got relegated to the 2011–12 Torneo Argentino A.

Season statistics

Top scorers

See also
2010–11 in Argentine football

References

External links

2
Primera B Nacional seasons
Arg